Stanground Newt Ponds is a  nature reserve in Peterborough in Cambridgeshire. It is managed by the Wildlife Trust for Bedfordshire, Cambridgeshire and Northamptonshire.

This site has ponds and a wet meadow, with smooth and great crested newts. Other fauna include common frogs, damselflies and dragonflies.

There is access from Hoylake Drive, which bisects the site.

References

Wildlife Trust for Bedfordshire, Cambridgeshire and Northamptonshire reserves